Muhammad Al-Moncef Al-Wahaibi (born 20 December 1949 Hajib el-Ayounin, Tunisia) is a Tunisian poet, writer and academic.

Education and Academic Career 
Muhammad Al-Moncef Al-Wahaibi was born in Hajeb El-Ayoun in the Kairouan governorate of Tunisia. He obtained his master's degree with the thesis "The visible body and the imagined body in the poetry of Adonis;" his PhD thesis at the Manouba University was on "The poetry industry of Abu Tammam and its components: in reading ancient and poetic text." He works as a lecturer at the Faculty of Arts and Humanities at the University of Kairouan and University of Sousse, Tunisia. He is a member of the Tunisian Academy of Sciences, Literature and Arts - Beit Al-Hikma.

Writing 
In 1996, Ouahibi wrote and wrote the script for the fictional documentary "Oh A Country Like Me," directed by Hisham Al-Jarbi, which centers around the 1914 visit of painter Paul Klee to Tunis, Hammamet and Kairouan. He co-wrote the film “Waiting for Ibn Rushd” for the same director in 1998. 

He has also worked  translating poetry into Arabic. In 1984 he translated, with Muhammad al-Ghazzi, the collection of Under the Aquarius by the Swedish Nobel committee member, Uston Shustrand. He also worked with the Portuguese poet Rosa Alice Branco to translate her poem "What Is Missing Green to Be a Tree" in 2002 and in the publication of "The Palm of Kairouan" in Arabic and Portuguese in 2003. 

Selected poems from his collections have been translated into French, English, German, Spanish, Portuguese and Swedish. He has several articles on the Alawan website and works as director of the "Ataba Cultural" association in Porto, Portugal.

Prizes 

 Aboul-Qacem Echebbi Prize for Poetry, 1999
 COMAR d'Or Prize, 2012
 'Akaaz Poetry Prize, 2014
 The Foundation of Abdulaziz Saud Al-Babtain's Prize for Poetic Creativity, 2014
 Sheikh Zayed Book Award, 2020

References

20th-century Tunisian poets
1949 births
Living people
People from Kairouan Governorate
Manouba University alumni
21st-century Tunisian poets